Shaun Bownes (born 24 October 1970, in Johannesburg) is a South African hurdler.

His personal best time is 13.26 seconds, achieved in July 2001 in Heusden. This was the African record until 2012 when it was beaten by Lehann Fourie. He still holds the African record in 60 metres hurdles (indoor) with 7.52 seconds, achieved in February 2001 in Ghent. In 2014 (aged 43) he won the M40 60 metres hurdles (indoor) at the World Masters Athletics Indoor Championships in Budapest in a time of 8,12 seconds (having set a time of 8.08 seconds in the preliminaries).

Achievements

[ Men 40-49 World Outdoor Championships Silver medal Lyon France ]
[ Unofficial world masters record 60m Hurdles 8.05 ( Outdoor) Potchefstroom 2016 ]
[ 2016 World Masters record 110 m Hurdles Pretoria 14.38 ]

References

External links

1970 births
Living people
South African male hurdlers
Athletes (track and field) at the 2000 Summer Olympics
Athletes (track and field) at the 2004 Summer Olympics
Athletes (track and field) at the 1998 Commonwealth Games
Athletes (track and field) at the 2002 Commonwealth Games
Athletes (track and field) at the 2006 Commonwealth Games
Olympic athletes of South Africa
Sportspeople from Johannesburg
South African people of British descent
Commonwealth Games gold medallists for South Africa
Commonwealth Games bronze medallists for South Africa
Commonwealth Games medallists in athletics
African Games bronze medalists for South Africa
African Games medalists in athletics (track and field)
Athletes (track and field) at the 1999 All-Africa Games
Athletes (track and field) at the 2007 All-Africa Games
Medallists at the 1998 Commonwealth Games
Medallists at the 2002 Commonwealth Games